The Commercial Bank of South Australia was a South Australian bank founded in 1878  that failed in February 1886 due to fraudulent loans and transfers by the Manager, Alexander Crooks and Accountant, Alexander McKenzie Wilson. It was also notable for the problems experienced in its liquidation.

Directors
John Beck; also largest shareholder, in London at time of collapse; never returned.
Charles Rischbieth
Maurice Salom
Robert Alfred Tarlton Chairman of Directors
Alfred Tennant
James Crabb Verco

References

External links
Ron A. Potter, "With Faith and Courage": The Bank of Adelaide 1865 - 1965 at ANZ Bank Retired Officers] Retrieved 27 Mar 2016]

Defunct banks of Australia
Bank failures
Banks disestablished in 1886
1886 disestablishments in Australia